is a professional Japanese stunt man and suit actor from Kōchi Prefecture who is best known for portraying the Red Ranger in most of the Power Rangers series as well as the Tyranno Ranger in the 1992 Super Sentai series Kyōryū Sentai Zyuranger.

He is a representative of Action School "Hero's Factory", based in Okinawa. His height is 176 centimeters. Maeda rides Harley-Davidson and Ducati motorcycles.

Maeda is a freelancer, although he was affiliated with ATC, Japan Action Club (now Japan Action Enterprise) and Red Action Club. After working on 1992's Kyōryū Sentai Zyuranger as the Tyranno Ranger, Maeda played the Red Rangers from Power Rangers, which became one of his most notable roles. Kazuo Niibori was Maeda's teacher.

Recently, a high level of action has been announced at an attraction show. At Hero's Factory, the school also does junior reading.

Performance Works

Local

Television
Space Sheriff Sharivan (1983) - Private Secretary (episode 29)
Jaaman Tanteidan Maringumi (1988) - Great Phantom Thief Jigoma
Tokkyuu Shirei Solbrain (1991) - Knight Fire
Choujin Sentai Jetman (1991) - Red Hawk
Kyōryū Sentai Zyuranger (1992) - Tyranno Ranger
Tokusou Robo Janperson (1993) - Gangibson
GARO (2005) - Dark Fang Kiba
Garo Special: Byakuya no Maju (2007) - DAN, The Knight of the Midnight Sun
Unofficial Sentai Akibaranger (2012) - Past Sentai Warrior

Films
Specter (2005) - Specter
Kamen Rider The First (2005) - Kamen Rider 1
Kamen Rider The Next (2007) - Kamen Rider 1
Kamen Rider × Super Sentai: Super Hero Taisen (2012) - Tyranno Ranger

Original Video Works
Ultraman vs. Kamen Rider (1993) - Kamen Rider 1
Jushin Thunder Liger: Fist of Thunder (1995) - Bounty Viper

Overseas

Television
Mighty Morphin Power Rangers (1993) - Red Power Ranger (Second and Third Seasons)
Power Rangers: Turbo (1997) - Red Turbo Ranger
Power Rangers: In Space (1998) - Red Space Ranger
Power Rangers: Lost Galaxy (1999) - Red Galaxy Ranger, Magna Defender
Power Rangers: Lightspeed Rescue (2000) - Red Lightspeed Ranger
Power Rangers: Time Force (2001) - Red Time Force Ranger
Power Rangers: Wild Force (2002) - Red Lion Ranger
Power Rangers: Ninja Storm (2003) - Red Wind Ranger
Kamen Rider Dragon Knight (2006/short film) (2009/airing) - Dragon Knight

Film
Turbo: A Power Rangers Movie (1997) - Red Turbo Ranger, Turbo Megazord

External links
Action School "Hero's Factory" (Japanese)

1961 births
Living people
People from Kōchi Prefecture